Thunberginol A is an isocoumarin found in Hydrangea macrophylla and the herbal preparation hydrangeae dulcis folium which is produced from its leaves.

References 

Isocoumarins